Sonnet 95 is one of 154 sonnets written by the English playwright and poet William Shakespeare. It is a member of the Fair Youth sequence, in which the poet expresses his love towards a young man.

Synopsis
The youth's dissolute behaviour is making corruption seem beautiful. Even descriptions of the youth's behaviour make it beautiful. The youth's beauty covers the blots of vice, but everything eventually loses its qualities if it is misused.

Structure 
Sonnet 95 is an English or Shakespearean sonnet. The English sonnet has three quatrains, followed by a final rhyming couplet. It follows the typical rhyme scheme of the form, ABAB CDCD EFEF GG, and is composed in iambic pentameter, a type of poetic metre based on five pairs of metrically weak/strong syllabic positions. The 11th line exemplifies a regular iambic pentameter:

  ×    /   ×    /    ×    / ×  /   ×   / 
Where beauty's veil doth cover every blot (95.11)
/ = ictus, a metrically strong syllabic position. × = nonictus.

The 8th line has both an initial and a mid-line reversal:

 / ×     ×  /     /  ×  ×  /    × / 
Naming thy name blesses an ill report. (95.8)

Initial reversals are also present in lines 6 and 10, and potentially in lines 2, 4, and 9.

The meter demands line 6's "lascivious" to function as three syllables.

Notes

References

British poems
Sonnets by William Shakespeare